Ear candling, also called ear coning or thermal-auricular therapy, is a pseudoscientific alternative medicine practice claiming to improve general health and well-being by lighting one end of a hollow candle and placing the other end in the ear canal. Medical research has shown that the practice is both dangerous and ineffective and does not functionally remove earwax or toxicants, despite product design contributing to that impression.

Safety and effectiveness
Edzard Ernst has published critically on the subject of ear candles, noting, "There is no data to suggest that it is effective for any condition. Furthermore, ear candles have been associated with ear injuries. The inescapable conclusion is that ear candles do more harm than good. Their use should be discouraged."

According to the US Food and Drug Administration (FDA), ear candling is sometimes promoted with claims that the practice can "purify the blood" or "cure" cancer. Health Canada has determined the candles have no effect on the ear, and no health benefit; instead they create risk of injury, especially when used on children. In October 2007, US FDA issued an alert identifying ear candles (also known as ear cones or auricular candles) as "dangerous to health when used in the dosage or manner, or with the frequency or duration, prescribed, recommended, or suggested in the labeling thereof... since the use of a lit candle in the proximity of a person's face would carry a high risk of causing potentially severe skin/hair burns and middle ear damage."

A 2007 paper in the journal Canadian Family Physician concludes:

A 2007 paper in American Family Physician said:

The Spokane Ear, Nose, and Throat Clinic conducted a research study in 1996 which concluded that ear candling does not produce negative pressure and was ineffective in removing wax from the ear canal. Several studies have shown that ear candles produce the same residue when burnt without ear insertion and that the residue is simply candle wax and soot.

, there are at least two cases in which people have set their houses on fire while ear candling, one of which resulted in death.

A survey of ear, nose and throat surgeons found some who had treated people with complications from ear candling, and that burns were the most common.

Procedure
One end of a cylinder or cone of waxed cloth is lit, and the other is placed into the subject's ear. The flame is cut back occasionally with scissors and extinguished between five and ten centimeters (two to four inches) from the subject.

The subject is lying on one side with the treated ear uppermost and the candle vertical. The candle can be stuck through a paper plate or aluminium pie tin to protect against any hot wax or ash falling onto the subject. Another way to perform ear candling involves the subject lying face up with the ear candle extending out to the side with a forty-five-degree upward slant.  A dish of water is placed next to the subject under the ear candle.

Proponents claim that the flame creates negative pressure, drawing wax and debris out of the ear canal, which appears as a dark residue.

An ear candling session lasts up to one hour, during which one or two ear candles may be burned for each ear.

Treatment is also performed by some naturopaths in Canada, although import and sale are prohibited by Health Canada. Jonathan Jarry from the Office for Science and Society says that the Association des naturopathes agréés du Québec (ANAQ) states in its code of ethics that "its members can only use natural health products that conform to the rule of Health Canada". Results from an inquiry performed by Jarry showed that out of 50 naturopaths in Quebec, two offered the treatment and five said the consumer should buy the candles and do it himself. Only one said that the use of ear candles is unethical.

Conventional removal of earwax
The conventional removal of earwax in medicine is done through an apparatus which creates a vacuum with which a doctor can remove excess earwax through suction. If the patient has a skin problem or the earwax is too sticky, an oil can be used to solubilise it so that excess earwax can be wiped off without inserting any object into the ear canal such as a cotton swab, which can damage the ear.

Product regulations 
In Europe, some ear candles bear the CE mark (93/42/EEC), though they are mostly self-issued by the manufacturer. This mark indicates that the device is designed and manufactured so as not to compromise the safety of patients, but no independent testing is required as proof.

While ear candles are widely available in the US, selling or importing them with medical claims is illegal. This means that one cannot market ear candles as products that "Diagnose, cure, treat, or prevent any disease".

In a report, Health Canada states "There is no scientific proof to support claims that ear candling provides medical benefits.... However, there is plenty of proof that ear candling is dangerous". It says that while some people claim to be selling the candles "for entertainment purposes only", the Canadian government maintains that there is no reasonable non-medical use, and hence any sale of the devices is illegal in Canada.

In a paper published by Edzard Ernst in the Journal of Laryngology & Otology, the cost of practicing ear candling according to the recommended frequency of use is estimated. As each candles costs US$3.15 (adjusted for inflation), the annual cost of the treatment would amount to US$982.00 (also adjusted for inflation). The author calls the continued practice of the treatment "a triumph of ignorance over science... or perhaps a triumph of commercial interests over medical reasoning."

Origin 
Although Biosun, a manufacturer of ear candles, refers to them as "Hopi" ear candles, there is no such treatment within traditional Hopi healing practices.  Vanessa Charles, public relations officer for the Hopi Tribal Council, has stated that ear candling "is not and has never been a practice conducted by the Hopi tribe or the Hopi people."  The Hopi tribe has repeatedly asked Biosun, the manufacturer of "Hopi Ear Candles", to stop using the Hopi name. Biosun ignored the request for over a decade until sometime after 2014 when the product was rebranded as "traditional earcandles" in Germany although the product is still marketed by third-party US resellers as "Hopi".

Many advocates of ear candles claim that the treatment originates from traditional Chinese, Egyptian, or North American medicine.  The mythical city of Atlantis is also reported to be the origin of this practice.

See also 
 Ear pick
 List of ineffective cancer treatments

References

External links 

 Horowitz, Janice M. (June 19, 2000). "Ear Candling". Time.

Alternative detoxification
Candles
Ear procedures
Pseudoscience